Turn Off the Light, Vol. 1 is a mixtape extended play by German singer-songwriter Kim Petras. It was released on 1 October 2018 through her own label, BunHead. Petras began promoting the EP in mid-September, posting heavily edited photos to Instagram of herself, according to Paper, "styled as a sexy dead Victoria's Secret angel/Hades side-chick/goth middle schooler's notebook-doodled fantasy. She later posted to Twitter that she "[couldn't] wait to share" a collaboration with Elvira. Two vinyl LP pressings were released on 20 September 2019: a "pink and white galaxy swirl" vinyl, which is exclusive to Urban Outfitters in the US, and a neon pink pressing which is a general retail release. The songs from the EP were incorporated into the full-length follow-up Turn Off the Light, which was released as her second studio album one year later on 1 October 2019.

Music
The EP opens with "Omen", inspired by the Halloween soundtrack, and contains "ominous production" and "heavenly vocals" by Petras before transitioning into "Close Your Eyes", called a "zombie-fied banger" with a "racing beat" by Idolator. "TRANSylvania" does not feature much of Petras' vocals, but includes a "throbbing bass and haunting sound effects". The title track "Turn Off the Light" drew inspiration from Britney Spears' album Blackout and features lyrics about "dangerous love" and a guest appearance from Elvira, who states: "Embrace your fear, don't dare to run. Only then will you be what you're meant to become." The "dark, dance-pop banger" was described as "LGBTQ+ excellence" by MTV News. "Tell Me It's a Nightmare" also concerns the theme of dangerous love, while "I Don't Wanna Die..." is a "synth-driven" song that, according to Idolator, could be heard at clubs. "In the Next Life" is a "dark pop" track and an "electro-kissed banger", while closing track "Boo! Bitch!" was considered to contain the same elements as "I Don't Wanna Die..."

Accolades

Track listing
Credits adapted from Tidal.

Notes
 "Omen" is stylised as "o m e n".
 "Transylvania" is stylised as "TRANSylvania".
 "I Don't Wanna Die..." is stylised in sentence case on some platforms and in all lowercase on others.

Charts

References

2018 EPs
2018 mixtape albums
Albums produced by Dr. Luke
Halloween albums
Kim Petras albums
Elvira, Mistress of the Dark
Pop music EPs
Disco EPs
Disco albums by German artists